Hugh Connolly, born in Derry, Ireland, is a former footballer who played for Cork and Ireland during the 1930s.

Ireland international
When Connolly played international football in 1936 there were, in effect, two Ireland teams, chosen by two rival associations. Both associations, the Northern Ireland - based IFA and the Irish Free State - based FAI claimed jurisdiction over the whole of Ireland and selected players from the whole island. Connolly was one of several players born in Northern Ireland who benefited from the FAI's attempts to establish an all-Ireland influence.

Connolly made his one and only appearance for the FAI XI on  17 October 1936 in a 5-2 win against Germany at Dalymount Park. Together with Bill Gorman, Plev Ellis, Tom Davis and Paddy Moore, Connolly was part of a team coached by Bill Lacey.

References

Association footballers from Northern Ireland
Republic of Ireland international footballers from Northern Ireland
Irish Free State international footballers
Cork F.C. players
League of Ireland players
Sportspeople from Derry (city)
Cork City F.C. (1938–1940) players
Association football defenders
1907 births
Year of death missing